United Nations Security Council Resolution 432, adopted unanimously on July 27, 1978, after reaffirming previous resolutions on the topic including 385 (1976), the Council urged for respect of Namibia's territorial integrity by South Africa and called for the full integration of Walvis Bay back into Namibia. The town had been directly administered by South Africa.

See also
 List of United Nations Security Council Resolutions 401 to 500 (1976–1982)

References
Text of the Resolution at undocs.org

External links
 

 0432
 0432
Walvis Bay
 0432
1978 in South Africa
1978 in South West Africa
July 1978 events